Jarreau (pronounced Jah Row) is an unincorporated community in the 7th Ward of Pointe Coupee Parish, Louisiana, United States. Jarreau is located approximately 30 miles northwest of Baton Rouge, and is a part of the Baton Rouge metropolitan area. The community is located on the banks of False River. It is situated on the southern end of this ox-bow lake, in an area known as "The Island". The community is served by Louisiana Highway 413, known locally as Island Road. The Jarreau Post Office (ZIP code 70749) is located on Boulevard D' Isle. Several local businesses (including Parrot's Bar and Horseshoe Auto Parts) were featured in scenes in the Billy Bob Thornton film "The Badge" (2002). The area is also known for fishing and boating with the main publicly accessible boat launch on the southern end of False River (Jerry's Landing) being located here.

History
The community is named for Elie Jarreau, the community's first postmaster.  The area's first post office was opened in July, 1912.  Elie Jarreau served as postmaster for the next 40 years.

References

External links
Jarreau Boundary Map

Baton Rouge metropolitan area
Unincorporated communities in Pointe Coupee Parish, Louisiana
Unincorporated communities in Louisiana

bg:Летсуърт